Atlanta Track Club is a non-profit, running organization for the Atlanta metropolitan area in Georgia, United States. It hosts over 30 events a year including the Thanksgiving Day Atlanta Half Marathon/5K and the AJC Peachtree Road Race. Atlanta Track Club was established in 1964 and is the second largest running organization in the United States. Its mission is to inspire and engage the community to achieve health and fitness through running.

Events and programs offered 
Atlanta Track Club provides multiple opportunities for runners and non-runners of all ages and ability levels to lead a more active lifestyle.
 The Publix Atlanta Marathon, held since 2007 (acquired by the Track Club in 2015), originally at Centennial Olympic Park, the race was moved to Atlanta Motor Speedway in Hampton in 2021.
 The AJC Peachtree Road Race, from 1970 to 2019, was the largest 10K road race in the world. Membership in Atlanta Track Club by February 1 each year provides guaranteed entry into the AJC Peachtree Road Race. 
 Invesco QQQ Half Marathon, 5K, One Mile & 50m Dash (formerly The Atlanta Marathon), annually on Thanksgiving Day from 1981 to 2019;  event history dates to 1963.
 The Atlanta 10 Miler & 5K, annually in late October.  In 2020, the event moved outside the city to Michelin Raceway in Hall County.
 Atlanta Women's 5K
 Run Around the Park Relay (formerly Atlanta Ekiden)
 A popular All Comers Track and Field meet summer series for all ages and ability levels
 In-Training Program, includes a number of race training programs held throughout the year
 Kilometer Kids youth running program
 Peachtree Junior, includes a 3K event open to children ages 7–12, a  event open to children ages 5–9, and the Lil' Peach a  dash race open to children ages 6 & younger, held annually since 1987

Running Series 

Grand Prix Series, a series of primarily low key, community events held throughout the year across metro Atlanta. A majority of Grand Prix events are free to members and only $10 for non-members. The Gran Prix Series races are as follows in the order by month held: 
Resolution Run 5K & One Mile - (January)
Southside 12K - (January) 
Hearts & Soles 5K - (February)
Singleton 4 Miler - (April)
Decatur Dekalb 4 Miler - (July), The oldest 4 Miller in the USA to be continually run on its original founding course without change.  
Atlanta’s Finest 5K - (August)
Wingfoot XC Classic - (September), A European style Cross Country meet for Middle School and High School Teams that offers a Kilometer Kids 1 mile and Community 5K Race open to the public.
PNC Atlanta 10 Miler & 5K - (October)

 Triple Peach Race Series, a reward program for competing in a series of Atlanta's three top events; AJC Peachtree Road Race (Not held in 2020), Atlanta 10 Miler (November 1) and Invesco QQQ Half Marathon (Not held in 2020).

Collaborations 

The following are events and programs Atlanta Track Club jointly puts on or participates in through collaborations with other organizations.
 Atlanta Hawks Fast Break 5K
 Braves Country 5K

Atlanta Track Club Elite 
Atlanta Track Club Elite (ATC) was founded in 2016 as a group of elite runners competing at the worlds highest level. The group mainly has a focus on the middle distance events of the 800m and 1500m. The group has a partnership with Adidas. 

On February 12, 2022, ATC member Shane Streich broke the Area Record in the Indoor 1000m running a time of 2:16.16 at the Norton Sports Center in Louisville, Kentucky.

Current Members

Listed from the Atlanta Track Club Elite Team Page.

 Ryan Adams
 Abe Alvarado
 Olivia Baker
 Bridget Belyeu
 Jonathan Davis
 Gemma Finch
 Sadi Henderson
 Maegan Krifchin
 Yolanda Ngarambe
 Daniel Nixon
 Hannah Segrave
 Shane Streich
 Allie Wilson
Former Members

 Ellie Abrahamson
 Abraham Alvarado
 Dylan Capwell
 Eden Meyer
 Keturah Orji

References

Track and field clubs in the United States
Running clubs in the United States
Organizations based in Atlanta
Culture of Atlanta
Sports in Atlanta
Sports clubs established in 1964
1964 establishments in Georgia (U.S. state)